El Corazón is an album by jazz trumpeter Don Cherry and drummer Ed Blackwell recorded in 1982 and released on the ECM label.

Reception

The AllMusic review by Scott Yanow awarded the album 4 stars stating "Trumpet and drum duets are not exactly commonplace, making this collaboration between Don Cherry and Ed Blackwell something special... The use of space is consistently impressive and those listeners with open ears will find this thoughtful date quite interesting".  

The authors of The Penguin Guide to Jazz Recordings praised the album's "sheer clarity of sound," and wrote: "Blackwell is immense, as ever, relishing the space and music which is freed from the vertical hierarchies of harmonic jazz."

Tyran Grillo, writing for Between Sound and Space, commented: "Blackwell's approach to his kit is melodic enough to carry its own, and the superb engineering gives him a wide berth, ensuring that every element has its place. Cherry's sidelong glances into piano, melodica, and organ, meanwhile, provide plenty of traction in the duo's more adventuresome tunes."

Track listing
All compositions by Don Cherry except where noted.
 "Mutron/Bemsha Swing/Solidarity/Arabian Nightingale" (Cherry/Thelonious Monk/Cherry/Cherry) - 15:18 
 "Roland Alphonso" (Roland Alphonso) - 3:17 
 "Makondi" - 3:49 
 "Street Dancing" (Ed Blackwell) - 2:21 
 "Short Stuff/El Corazón/Rhythm for Runner" (Blackwell/Cherry/Blackwell) 7:29 
 "Near-In" (Blackwell) - 6:43 
 "Voice of the Silence" - 5:33 
Recorded at Tonstudio Bauer in Ludwigsburg, West Germany in February 1982

Personnel
Don Cherry — pocket trumpet, piano, melodica, organ, xalam
Ed Blackwell — drums, wood drum, cowbell

References

ECM Records albums
Don Cherry (trumpeter) albums
Ed Blackwell albums
1982 albums
Albums produced by Manfred Eicher